The Birds of Paris is a collective name for a group of (mostly) disco backing vocalists, who worked for the main part with Alec R. Costandinos and on some of his side projects like Sphinx and Sumeria. They also worked with Cerrone. A few of these singers later had successful careers of their own (Sue and Sunny, Katie Kissoon, Madeline Bell, Stephanie de Sykes and Vicki Brown). The group included Joanne Stone, Kay Garner, Stephanie de Sykes, Steve Short, Sue Glover and Sunny Leslie, Vicki Brown and Madeline Bell.

References

Alec R. Costandinos & The Syncophonic Orchestra - Romeo & Juliet (under: Performer) 

Alec R. Costandinos Biography, Songs, & Albums

Disco groups